Alexandru Nicolae (born 17 March 1955) is a Romanian former football defender.

Club career
Alexandru Nicolae was born on 17 March 1955 in Bucharest where he started playing football at junior level in 1968 at ȘSE 2 București and in 1973 he played at Sportul Studențesc București's youth academy. In 1974 he started his senior career, playing four seasons in Divizia B at Gloria Buzău, helping the team promote to Divizia A where he made his debut on 24 August 1978 in a 1–0 loss against CS Târgoviște. After playing two seasons in Divizia A with Gloria Buzău, he went to play for Olt Scornicești for two seasons and even if during this time he had offers to play for Steaua București, he chose in 1982 to follow his dream which was to play for Dinamo București. In his first two seasons at Dinamo, the club won two consecutive Divizia A titles, in the first he appeared in 30 games in which he scored four goals and in the second he played 30 games without scoring. Nicolae also won two Cupa României with the Red Dogs and appeared in 23 matches in European competitions, including 7 games in the 1983–84 European Cup as the club reached the semi-finals. In 1989, Nicolae alongside teammates Dumitru Moraru and Costel Orac were transferred from Dinamo to Victoria București where he only stayed half a season, appearing in three Divizia A games and made one appearance in the 1989–90 UEFA Cup, before returning in the second half of the season at Dinamo where he won another title for which he contributed with 5 games played and a cup. The Divizia A 1990–91 was the last season of Alexandru Nicolae's career, playing in 5 games, making his last Divizia A appearance on 11 May 1991 in a 3–0 victory against Universitatea Craiova, having a total of 301 Divizia A appearances with 15 goals scored and 24 matches played in European competitions.

International career
Alexandru Nicolae played 19 games at international level for Romania, managing to score one goal in his debut which took place on 14 October 1979 under coach Constantin Cernăianu in a friendly against the Soviet Union which ended with a 3–1 loss. He played in four qualification matches for Euro 1980 and 1984, also appearing in one qualification match for the 1982 World Cup. His last appearance for the national team took place on 2 September 1987 in a friendly against Poland which ended with a 3–1 loss.

International goals
Scores and results list Romania's goal tally first, score column indicates score after each Nicolae goal.

Honours
Gloria Buzău
Divizia B: 1977–78
Dinamo București
Divizia A: 1982–83, 1983–84, 1989–90
Cupa României: 1983–84, 1985–86, 1989–90

Notes

References

1955 births
Living people
Romanian footballers
Romania international footballers
Association football defenders
Liga I players
Liga II players
FC Gloria Buzău players
FC Dinamo București players
FC Olt Scornicești players
Victoria București players
Footballers from Bucharest